Zeyaur R. Khan is a professor and the principal scientist at International Centre of Insect Physiology and Ecology (icipe). He has dedicated his 30-year career as an international agricultural scientist to advancing the science and practice of agriculture by studying and applying chemical ecology, behavior, plant-plant and insect-plant interactions to improve farm productivity to combat poverty and food insecurity in Africa. He is responsible for the discovery and wide scale implementation of a pro-poor scientific innovation for enhancing food security and environmental sustainability in Africa]. This was achieved through the biologically-based IPM technology called "Push-Pull", developed for small-holder cereal-livestock African farmers. Prof. Khan’s work is an example demonstrating that creativity and innovation in science can provide practical solutions for the real problems of thousands of small-holder poor farmers and promote their food security and sustainable livelihoods.

Career 
 M.S. (1977) Entomology, Indian Agricultural Research Institute, New Delhi, India
 Ph.D.(1980) Entomology, Indian Agricultural Research Institute, New Delhi, India, Research on insect-plant interactions in cotton
 Post-Doctoral Fellow (1983-1985). International Rice Research Institute, Philippines, Research on chemical ecology of rice leafhoppers and planthoppers
 Research Associate (1985-1986) University of Wisconsin, Madison, WI, USA, Research on mechanism of resistance in soybean to lepidopteran insects

Appointments 
 1993–present. Principal Scientist and Leader of Habitat Management Program, International Centre of Insect Physiology and Ecology (ICIPE), Nairobi, Kenya
 2009–present. Visiting Professor, Entomology Department, Cornell University, Ithaca, NY
 1991-1993. Visiting Scientist, Kansas State University, Manhattan, KS
 1986-1991. Entomologist, International Rice Research Institute, Philippines
 1985-1986. Research Associate (1985-1986) University of Wisconsin, Madison, WI
 1983-1985. Post-Doctoral Fellow, International Rice Research Institute, Philippines
 1980-1983. Assistant Professor of Entomology, Rajendra Agricultural University, India

Recent Awards and Recognitions 
 2010, Fellow, Entomological Society of America
 2010, Fellow, Royal Entomological Society, London, UK
 2010, Nan-Yao Su Award for Innovation and Creativity in Entomology
 2010, Distinguished Scientist, International Branch of Entomological Society of America
 2010, Elected on the Council of International Congress of Entomology
 2009, International Integrated Pest Management Excellence Award
 2009, Visiting Professor, Cornell University, Ithaca, New York
 2008, Plenary speaker, International Congress of Entomology, July 2008

References

Indian agronomists
Living people
Year of birth missing (living people)